Marc Koot (born 23 November 1990 in Uden) is a Dutch professional footballer who last played as a striker for Helmond Sport in the Dutch Eerste Divisie He formerly played for FC Oss.

References

External links
 Voetbal International profile 

1990 births
Living people
Dutch footballers
TOP Oss players
Helmond Sport players
Eerste Divisie players
People from Uden
Association football forwards
Footballers from North Brabant